Ostoja-Ostaszewski is a Polish noble family which had a number of residences in pre-war Poland, among others a palace in Cracow and a castle in Wzdów. It belongs to the medieval Clan of Ostoja, influential in the Polish-Lithuanian Commonwealth, Hungary and Ukraine. 

Notable members of the family include: Tomasz Ostaszewski (1746-1817), bishop of Płock, Nereusz Ostaszewski (1755-1803), member of the Great Sejm, Teofil Ostaszewski (1807-1889), landlord and politician, as well as a number of women known from charity work and patronage: Emma Ostaszewska née countess Załuska (1831-1912), countess Maria Dzieduszycka née Ostaszewska (1851-1918) and countess Zofia Tarnowska née Ostaszewska (1902-1982).

Gallery

References
 "The House of Ostaszewski", in: Załuski, Iwo, The Ogiński Gene. The History of a Musical Dynasty, Gomer Press (2012).  

Ostaszewski family
Polish noble families
Clan of Ostoja